"Licking Stick – Licking Stick" is a song written by James Brown, Bobby Byrd, and Alfred "Pee Wee" Ellis and recorded by Brown as a two-part single in 1968. Byrd provides backing vocals on the song. It was the first stereo single release by King Records. The song was included on the album Say It Loud – I'm Black and I'm Proud.

The title of the song refers to a stick used to administer corporal punishment (a "licking").

Chart positions

Live version
Brown performs live versions of "Licking Stick – Licking Stick" on his 1970 album Sex Machine, as well as on the 1998 release Say It Live and Loud: Live in Dallas 08.26.68.

References

External links
 AllMusic review

James Brown songs
1968 singles
Songs written by James Brown
Songs written by Bobby Byrd
Songs written by Alfred "Pee Wee" Ellis
King Records (United States) singles
1968 songs